KZLF ("Werewolf 97.5 FM") is a radio station broadcasting an adult hits and Active Rock music format licensed to Alva, Oklahoma, United States. The station is currently owned by Running Wolf Radio LLC, which purchased it from George S. Flinn, Jr. in 2022.

References

External links

ZLF
Radio stations established in 2004
2004 establishments in Oklahoma